Moses Phillips was a professional baseball first baseman in the Negro leagues. He played with the Homestead Grays in 1946.

References

External links
 and Seamheads

Homestead Grays players
Year of birth missing
Year of death missing
Baseball first basemen